Surabaya–Gresik Toll Road is a toll road in Indonesia, located between Surabaya and Gresik in the island of Java. The highway is 21 kilometers long. The highway acts as a complement for Trans-Java Expressway.

Description
The highway starts on a cloverleaf with the Surabaya–Gempol Toll Road, and leads westward with 2x2 lanes, and crosses industrial sites west of Surabaya. The motorway then forms a large bypass of the port city of Gresik, which serves the motorway with two non-level connections. Then the highway ends with a crossroads north of Gresik on a main road that goes further west along the coast.

Exits

References

Toll roads in Indonesia
Surabaya
Transport in East Java